General Algernon Seymour, 7th Duke of Somerset (11 November 16847 February 1750), styled Earl of Hertford until 1748, of Petworth House in Sussex, was a British Army officer and Whig politician who sat in the House of Commons from 1708 until 1722 when he was raised to the House of Lords as Baron Percy.

Background
Seymour was the only son of Charles Seymour, 6th Duke of Somerset, by his first wife, the heiress Lady Elizabeth Percy, deemed Baroness Percy in her own right, the only surviving child of Joceline Percy, 11th and last Earl of Northumberland. He set out on a Grand Tour at the age of 17, visiting Italy from 1701 to 1703 and Austria in 1705.

Public life

Seymour was still in Austria when he was returned as Member of Parliament for Marlborough on the recommendation of his father at a by-election on 27 November 1705. In 1706 he was appointed Lord-Lieutenant of Sussex for the rest of his life. He went to Flanders in the summer of 1708 to serve as a volunteer under the Duke of Marlborough and brought back news of the relief of Brussels in November. At the 1708 British general election, he was returned as a Whig MP for both Marlborough and Northumberland and chose to sit for Northumberland. He became a Colonel of the 15th Foot in 1709, and was returned in the subsequent by-election. He acted as a teller for the Whigs on several occasions and voted for the impeachment of Dr Sacheverell in 1710. At the 1710 British general election he was returned again as Whig MP for Northumberland. He was appointed Governor of Tynemouth Castle by Robert Harley in 1711 and was also appointed a justice of the peace for Northumberland. In Parliament, he voted for the motion of ‘No Peace without Spain’ on 7 December 1711. He was returned again for Northumberland at the 1713 British general election and spoke strongly in support of Richard Steele, voting against his expulsion. In 1714 he was appointed Groom of the Bedchamber to the Prince of Wales. 
 
Seymour was returned unopposed as Whig MP for Northumberland at the 1715 British general election and proposed Spencer Compton as Speaker on 17 March 1715. He also became colonel of the 2nd Life Guards. He moved for the impeachment of Lord Kenmure, a rebel lord, in January 1716 and voted against the Government on Lord Cadogan in June 1717. When there was a break in relations between George I and his son Frederick, Prince of Wales later in 1717 he resigned his post as Groom of the Bedchamber to the Prince. He was returned again unopposed at the 1722 British general election. On 16 October 1722 took the chair at a committee of the whole House on the bill to suspend the Habeas Corpus Act. On his mother's death on 23 November 1722, he was summoned to the House of Lords as Lord Percy and vacated his seat in the House of Commons.

Percy was Custos Rotulorum of Wiltshire from 1726 to 1750. He became a brigadier-general in 1727 and in the same year was appointed Governor of Minorca, a post he held until 1742. He was promoted to major-general in 1735 and to lieutenant-general in 1739. From 1740 to 1750 he was colonel of the Royal Horse Guards and then served as Governor of Guernsey from 1742 to 1750. In 1748 he succeeded his father as Duke of Somerset.

Land ownership and titles
The Duke's only son Lord Beauchamp died unmarried in 1744, aged 19 (see below). In 1748 Somerset was created Baron Warkworth, of Warkworth Castle in the County of Northumberland, and Earl of Northumberland, with remainder to his son-in-law, Sir Hugh Smithson, 4th Baronet, with the intention that the majority of the Percy estates should descend in this line. He was at the same time created Baron of Cockermouth, in the County of Cumberland, and Earl of Egremont, with remainder to his nephews, Sir Charles Wyndham, 4th Baronet, of Orchard Wyndham, and Percy Wyndham-O'Brien, a revival of the Egremont title held by an earlier member of the Percy family, Thomas Percy, 1st Baron Egremont.

Family
 Somerset married Frances Thynne, daughter of Henry Thynne and granddaughter of Thomas Thynne, 1st Viscount Weymouth. This Thomas Thynne was the first cousin of "Tom of ten thousand", who had been the second husband of Algernon's own mother, Elizabeth. Somerset and Frances had two children:

George Seymour, Viscount Beauchamp (11 September 172511 September 1744), predeceased his father, unmarried.
Elizabeth Percy, suo jure 2nd Baroness Percy (26 November 17165 December 1776), married Sir Hugh Smithson, 4th Baronet, later 2nd Earl of Northumberland by right of his wife and 1st Duke of Northumberland by creation; had issue.

Somerset died in 1750 and was buried in the Northumberland Vault, within Westminster Abbey. He was one of the richest landowners in England, but as he died with no surviving son his estates were split after his death. The ducal title passed to a distant cousin, Edward Seymour, 8th Duke of Somerset. The earldom of Northumberland and most of the traditional Percy estates passed to his daughter and her husband (see Alnwick Castle, Northumberland House and Syon House). Petworth in Sussex passed to the duke's nephew Charles Wyndham, 2nd Earl of Egremont. Later dukes of Somerset lived at Maiden Bradley, a far more modest estate than those already mentioned, and for a short while at Stover House, Teigngrace, Devon and at Berry Pomeroy, Devon.

References

|-

|-

|-

1684 births
1750 deaths
British Army generals
British Life Guards officers
British MPs 1707–1708
British MPs 1708–1710
British MPs 1710–1713
British MPs 1713–1715
British MPs 1715–1722
Algernon
Burials at Westminster Abbey
507
East Yorkshire Regiment officers
Lord-Lieutenants of Sussex
English MPs 1705–1707
Hertford, Algernon Seymour, Earl of
Royal Horse Guards officers
Algernon Seymour, 07th Duke of Somerset
Peers of Great Britain created by George I
Baron Seymour of Trowbridge
Whig (British political party) MPs for English constituencies
Presidents of the Society of Antiquaries of London
Earls of Egremont